Louise Michel is the name of the former French patrol boat Suroît, originally built for the Directorate-General of Customs and Indirect Taxes. It was refitted in 2020 to patrol rescue zones in the Mediterranean Sea.

History

Suroît 

Suroît was commissioned in 1988 as one of two Avel Gwalarn-class patrol boats built by the Estérel shipyard in Cannes. The hull was planked with three layers of mahogany wood. The vessel was christened by French biathlete Emmanuelle Claret and put in service by the Directorate-General of Customs and Indirect Taxes with the pennant number DF 42.

The ship was stationed at the French Atlantic coast in Royan. In 2014 the crew had spent about 2,000 hours at sea, performing inspections of 150 vessels in the vicinity of the Île d'Yeu.

In July 2016 an article about the restructuring of the French customs service naval branch mentioned that Suroît would not be repaired and transitionally anchored in La Rochelle. The closing of the Royan customs brigade itself became effective on 30 September 2018.

Suroît was sold to an anonymous bidder, who intended to put together a crew of professional rescuers.

Louise Michel
The ship was transferred to Camaret-sur-Mer and activists started repair and refit in 2020. They assured the public they were not planning to bring any migrant boats to Camaret-sur-Mer and claimed not to be associated with other non-governmental organizations (NGOs), but Italian media classified the group as a spin-off of the German Sea-Watch NGO.

The newspaper La Stampa associated street artist and activist Banksy with Louise Michel, citing sources and referring to artwork on the ship. Banksy had announced in 2019 that he intended to buy a rescue ship.

In the summer of 2020 Louise Michel was initially docked at the Spanish port of Burriana along other NGO vessels. When the larger Sea-Watch 4 left Burriana in late August, she met with Louise Michel near the Libyan coast. The crew of Louise Michel had taken seven migrants on board. The migrants were transferred to Sea-Watch 4.

Financer Banksy had recruited activist and veteran NGO-captain Pia Klemp for Louise Michels first mission, The Guardian revealed on 27 August 2020 shortly after the ship's crew had picked up 89 migrants. The crew on this first mission consisted of 10 activists, who all identify as anti-racist and anti-fascist. Other crewmembers named were Lea Reisner and Claire Faggianelli, both associated with Sea-Watch and other rescue organisations in the past.

On 28 August the activists had picked up another 130 migrants, putting the crew of 10 in charge of 219 people. The crew sent out a distress call asking Italian and Maltese coast guards for help, stating on Twitter that one person was dead and Louise Michel had become disabled by a life raft towed to its side. The next day, the Italian coast guard arrived and evacuated those most in need of assistance: 32 women, 13 children and 4 men were transferred to a coast guard vessel from Lampedusa. By that time, Louise Michels fellow rescue ships Sea-Watch 4 and Mare Ionio were also on the way to assist. After transferring all migrants over to other vessels, Louise Michel headed for the Balearic Islands, arriving in Mallorca in the first week of September. On 22 October 2020 the activists made public that they are not allowed to continue their mission, because their registration is being disputed.

References

External links
 
 

Ships built in France
1988 ships